Marion Susanne Michielsen (born 2 August 1985) is a Dutch-Swedish professional bridge player. At the annual World Bridge Federation (WBF) meet in October 2014, she played on teams that won two world championships. Thus she became a World Women Grand Master.

In the European Bridge League championships of both 2004 and 2005, she played on both the under-21 (Schools) and the under-26 women (Girls) Dutch teams.

In world championship  competition, Michielsen was a member of two 6-person teams that won quadrennial tournaments at Sanya, China in October 2014, namely the World Mixed Teams Championship (teams of male–female pairs) and the McConnell Cup (women teams). She played in partnerships with Zia Mahmood and Meike Wortel respectively.

In 2013, she has relocated to Sweden and now aims to represent Sweden in the Bermuda Bowl.

Bridge accomplishments

Wins
 World Bridge Series Women Teams (1) 2022
 Buffett Cup (1) 2008
 North American Bridge Championships (3)
 Machlin Women's Swiss Teams (1) 2013 
 Sternberg Women's Board-a-Match Teams (2) 2012, 2013

Runners-up

 North American Bridge Championships (4)
 Wagar Women's Knockout Teams (2) 2008, 2013 
 Sternberg Women's Board-a-Match Teams (2) 2008, 2011

Notes

References

External links
 
 
 Marion Michielsen  at Le personalita del bridge (infobridge.it) – with low-quality English version
 Bridge Kids: Marion Michielsen audio-video conversation at YouTube (7 April 2011)
 BridgeTopics: Marion Michielsen slow start audio-video conversation at YouTube (19 October 2011)

1985 births
Dutch contract bridge players
Swedish contract bridge players
Living people
Place of birth missing (living people)